Gerald R. Ford is a bronze sculpture depicting the former American president of the same name by J. Brett Grill, installed at the United States Capitol's rotunda, in Washington, D.C., as part of the National Statuary Hall Collection. The statue was gifted by the U.S. state of Michigan in 2011, and replaced one depicting Zachariah Chandler, which was donated in 1913.
The statue would later get national recognition during the 2021 storming of the United States Capitol, where it was photographed donned with a Make America Great Again hat, as well as a Donald Trump 2020 presidential campaign flag.

See also
 2011 in art
 List of sculptures of presidents of the United States

References

External links
 

2011 establishments in Washington, D.C.
Bronze sculptures in Washington, D.C.
Cultural depictions of Gerald Ford
Monuments and memorials in Washington, D.C.
Ford, Gerald
Sculptures of men in Washington, D.C.
Statues of presidents of the United States